Letterkenny Township is a township in Franklin County, Pennsylvania, United States. The population was 2,462 at the 2020 census, up from 2,074 at the 2000 census.

History
The township is named after Letterkenny in County Donegal, Ireland. The Horse Valley Bridge, Rocky Spring Presbyterian Church, and Skinner Tavern are listed on the National Register of Historic Places.

Geography
The township is in north-central Franklin County. The eastern half of the township is in the Great Appalachian Valley, while the western half occupied by the eastern two ridges of the Ridge-and-Valley Appalachians. Broad Mountain and Blue Mountain form the easternmost ridge, while Blue Mountain forms the western town border. Between the two ridges is Horse Valley, drained northeastward by Conodoguinet Creek, which turns and forms the northern boundary of the township as the creek leaves the mountains and enters the Great Appalachian Valley.

The southeastern part of the township is within the Letterkenny Army Depot. North of the depot are the unincorporated communities of Upper Strasburg and Pleasant Hall.

Neighboring Townships

  Fannett Township (north)
  Greene Township (southeast)
  Hamilton Township (south)
  Lurgan Township (northeast)
  Metal Township (west)
  Southampton Township (east)
  St. Thomas Township (southwest)

Communities

  Pleasant Hall
  Upper Strasburg

Demographics

As of the census of 2000, there were 2,074 people, 783 households, and 617 families residing in the township.  The population density was 29.5 people per square mile (11.4/km2).  There were 829 housing units at an average density of 11.8/sq mi (4.6/km2).  The racial makeup of the township was 98.07% White, 1.35% African American, 0.10% Native American, 0.10% Asian, 0.29% from other races, and 0.10% from two or more races. Hispanic or Latino of any race were 0.58% of the population.

There were 783 households, out of which 33.3% had children under the age of 18 living with them, 67.8% were married couples living together, 5.9% had a female householder with no husband present, and 21.1% were non-families. 16.9% of all households were made up of individuals, and 6.8% had someone living alone who was 65 years of age or older.  The average household size was 2.65 and the average family size was 2.96.

In the township the population was spread out, with 24.5% under the age of 18, 8.9% from 18 to 24, 30.8% from 25 to 44, 24.0% from 45 to 64, and 11.9% who were 65 years of age or older.  The median age was 37 years. For every 100 females there were 105.6 males.  For every 100 females age 18 and over, there were 106.1 males.

The median income for a household in the township was $40,897, and the median income for a family was $44,545. Males had a median income of $30,431 versus $21,875 for females. The per capita income for the township was $18,315.  About 1.8% of families and 4.7% of the population were below the poverty line, including 7.3% of those under age 18 and 5.3% of those age 65 or over.

Popular Culture
Letterkenny Township is referenced in Season 9 Episode 7 of the Canadian TV Series Letterkenny, as the township shares its name with the show's titular town.

References

External links
Letterkenny Township official website

Populated places established in 1736
Townships in Franklin County, Pennsylvania